Henri Kontinen and John Peers were the defending champions, but chose not to participate this year.

Juan Sebastián Cabal and  Robert Farah won the title, defeating Jérémy Chardy and Fabrice Martin in the final, 6–3, 6–3.

Seeds

Draw

Draw

References
 Main Draw

Doubles